The Dronning Louise (Queen Louise) is a restaurant and pub in the centre of Esbjerg, Denmark. A listed building since 1989, its facade overlooking the market place was fully restored in 1994.

History
Located on Esbjerg's market square (Torvet), the two-storey building was designed as a hotel and completed in 1890. Over the years, it has also been used for offices and shops but has mainly been a pub. After it became a listed building in 1989, the facade of brick and sandstone was fully restored in 1993–94.

References

External links
Dronning Louise webside

Buildings and structures in Esbjerg
Buildings and structures completed in 1892
Restaurants in Denmark
Drinking establishments in Europe
Food and drink companies of Denmark